Spidermonkey may refer to:

 Spider monkey, tropical forest animals of Central and South America
 SpiderMonkey (software), a JavaScript engine
 Spidermonkey, a fictional character, one of the Ben 10 aliens
 Jake Spidermonkey, a fictional My Gym Partner's a Monkey character